Beitz is a German surname. Notable people with the surname include:

Berthold Beitz (1913–2013), German businessman
Charles Beitz (born 1949), American political scientist

See also
Betz (surname)

German-language surnames